Schizothorax skarduensis is a species of ray-finned fish in the genus Schizothorax which is endemic to Pakistan.

References

Schizothorax
Fish described in 1978